The 1800 United States presidential election in Connecticut took place between October 31 and December 3, 1800, as part of the 1800 United States presidential election. The state legislature chose nine representatives, or electors, to the Electoral College, who voted for President and Vice President.

Connecticut cast nine electoral votes for incumbent Federalist President and New England native John Adams. However, Adams would lose to Democratic-Republican candidate Thomas Jefferson nationally.

See also
 United States presidential elections in Connecticut

References

Connecticut
1800
1800 Connecticut elections